Histatin 3, also known as HTN3, is a protein which in humans is encoded by the HTN3 gene.


Function 

The primary protein encoded by HTN3 is histatin 3. Histatins are a family of small, histidine-rich, salivary proteins, encoded by at least two loci (HTN3 and HTN1).  Post-translational proteolytic processing results in many histatins: e.g., histatins 4-6 are derived from histatin 3 by proteolysis. Histatins 1 and 3 are primary products of HIS1(1) and HIS2(1) alleles, respectively. Histatins are believed to have important non-immunological, anti-microbial function in the oral cavity. Histatin 1 and histatin 2 are major wound-closing factors in human saliva.

References

Further reading

Antimicrobial peptides